Schumer is a surname.  Notable people with the surname include:

 Amy Schumer (born 1981), American comedian and actress
 Chuck Schumer (born 1950), American Senator and Democratic politician
 Fern Schumer Chapman, American author

See also 

 Schumer box, the summary of the costs of a credit card, named after Chuck Schumer